The Last POW Camp Memorial is a memorial in the district of Ranau in the Malaysian state of Sabah, which commemorates the victims of the Sandakan Death Marches who died during their march to Ranau. Of 1,047 British and Australian prisoners of war, only 189 survived to reach this site which is located near Liwagu Valley. Of these 189 total, 153 prisoners died in the next six weeks, 32 were murdered, while only four managed to escape. The current memorial was built where the former camp was located.

History 

The discovery of the camp location goes back to the Australian historian Lynette Silver. The land where the site is located is private property owned by Dr. Othman Minudin who stated that the land should "forever" remain as a memorial. The order also includes that the actual camp site will remain untouched by nature. The memorial stone was erected on 27 August 2009, handed over by the Minister of Tourism Datuk Masidi Manjun, by the land owner Dr. Othman and Lynette Silver as a representative of the members of the public.

Description 

The memorial is located about 8 kilometres south of Ranau on the road to Tambunan above the Liwagu Valley. The memorial is fenced, but is open from 9 a.m. to 5 p.m. to the public. On a large concrete surface in the shape of a star is a stele of concrete. On the surface of the concrete, 1,047 boulders, originating from the Liwagu River (the river flows below the memorial site), have been inserted. These stones on the concrete surface symbolise each prisoner of war.

The stele is also made of concrete. Another 183 river stones are set into the concrete of the stele; one for each prisoner of war who died in this camp on Liwagu River. On the memorial stone there are four furrowed stone slabs. These stand for the four prisoners of war, who managed to escape during the death march. On each of the four sides of the stele is a stone slab of embedded polished granite. Three panels concerning the history of the death marches are shown in English, Chinese and Malay. On the fourth granite slab, the names of 183 prisoners of war are memorialised.

The memorial stone in English bears the following inscription:

POW route 

The "Last POW Camp Memorial" is the final station of the "POW Route" during the three death marches. The route begins in Sandakan and ends at the "Last Camp" of Ranau. Each station on the route is marked with a sign.

Literature 
 Lynette Ramsay Silver: Sandakan – A Conspiracy of Silence, 4. Auflage, Sally Milner Publishing Pty, 2011,

References 

Monuments and memorials in Sabah
Japanese prisoner of war and internment camps
History of North Borneo
History of Sabah
Military history of Japan during World War II
Japanese war crimes